The Lang ministry (1930–1932) or Third Lang ministry was the 45th ministry of the New South Wales Government, and was led by the 23rd Premier, Jack Lang. This ministry was the third and final time of three occasions where Lang was Premier.

Lang was first elected to the New South Wales Legislative Assembly in 1913 and served continuously until 1946. In 1923 Lang was elected NSW Parliamentary Leader of the Labor Party by Labor caucus, and became Leader of the Opposition. At the 1925 state election, Lang led Labor to victory, defeating the Nationalist Party led by Sir George Fuller.

Lang's initial ministry was confronted with extended cabinet strife, centred on Albert Willis. Lang gained the approval of the Governor to reconstruct the ministry, his second as Lang Labor, subject to an early election, held in October 1927. Defeated by a Nationalist/Country coalition led by Thomas Bavin and Ernest Buttenshaw at the 1927 election, Lang again won government at the 1930 election, in the middle of the Great Depression.

This ministry covers the period from 4 November 1930 until 13 May 1932 when the Governor of New South Wales, Sir Philip Game used the reserve power of The Crown to remove Lang as Premier (see Lang Dismissal Crisis), and appointed Bertram Stevens as Premier.

Composition of ministry
The composition of the ministry was announced by Premier Lang on 4 November 1930 and covers the period up to 13 May 1932. 

 
Ministers are members of the Legislative Assembly unless otherwise noted.

See also

First Lang ministry
Second Lang ministry
Members of the New South Wales Legislative Assembly, 1930-1932
Members of the New South Wales Legislative Council, 1930-1932

References

 

New South Wales ministries
1930 establishments in Australia
1932 disestablishments in Australia
Australian Labor Party ministries in New South Wales